Geibennach mac Aedha (died 973) was 34th King of Uí Maine.

Reign

Geibennach's era is poorly documented. Events which occurred in his time included:

960. Murchadh, son of Aedh, lord of Ui-Maine of Connaught, died. Inis-mor in Loch-Ribh was taken by Murchadh Ua Ceallaigh from Ceallach, son of Ruarc, lord of Feara-Cul Teathbha, i.e. lord of the Sil-Ronain; and he was carried as a prisoner with his fleet into Ui-Maine.

961.An unusual thing was done by the King Domhnall, son of Muircheartach; namely, he brought vessels over Dabhall, and across Sliabh Fuaid, to Loch Ainninn, so that the islands of the lake were plundered by him.

961.A victory was gained by Fearghal, King of Connaught, over the Munstermen, upon the Sinainn, i.e. the victory of Catinchi, between Cluain-fearta and Cluain-mic-Nois; and Dal-gCais was afterwards plundered by him.

963.An intolerable famine in Ireland, so that the father used to sell his son and daughter for food.

971.Finachta Ua Flaithri, Abbot of Tir-da-ghlas, and Conchobhar, son of Tadhg of the Tower, King of Connaught, died.

References

 Annals of Ulster at CELT: Corpus of Electronic Texts at University College Cork
 Annals of Tigernach at CELT: Corpus of Electronic Texts at University College Cork
Revised edition of McCarthy's synchronisms at Trinity College Dublin.
 Byrne, Francis John (2001), Irish Kings and High-Kings, Dublin: Four Courts Press, 

People from County Galway
People from County Roscommon
10th-century Irish monarchs
Kings of Uí Maine
Year of birth missing
973 deaths
Gaels